9084 Achristou, provisional designation , is a stony Hungaria asteroid from the innermost regions of the asteroid belt, about 1.9 kilometers in diameter. It was discovered by British astronomer David J. Asher at Siding Spring Observatory in New South Wales, Australia, on 3 February 1995. The asteroid was named after British planetary astronomer Apostolos Christou.

Orbit and classification 

Achristou is a member of the Hungaria family, which form the innermost dense concentration of asteroids in the Solar System. It orbits the Sun at a distance of 1.7–2.0 AU once every 2 years and 6 months (926 days). Its orbit has an eccentricity of 0.08 and an inclination of 23° with respect to the ecliptic.

Physical characteristics 

Achristou has been characterized as a bright E-type asteroid.

Rotation period 

In May 2013, a rotational lightcurve of Achristou was obtained from photometric observations by American astronomer Robert Stephens at the Center for Solar System Studies in California. Lightcurve analysis gave a rotation period of  hours with a low brightness variation of 0.09 magnitude.

Diameter and albedo 

Based on the survey carried out by the NEOWISE mission of NASA's space-based Wide-field Infrared Survey Explorer, Achristou measures 1.9 kilometers in diameter and its surface has an albedo of 0.33, while the Collaborative Asteroid Lightcurve Link assumes an albedo of 0.30 and calculates a diameter of 1.8 kilometers with an absolute magnitude of 15.7.

Naming 

This minor planet was named after Apostolos Christou (born 1968), planetary astronomer and programmer at the North Irish Armagh Observatory, after which the minor planet 10502 Armaghobs was named. His field or research include minor planets in co-orbit with Venus, designing near-Earth asteroids missions, the dwarf planet 1 Ceres, meteor impacts on Venus, as well as the irregular satellite families of the outer planets. The official naming citation was published by the Minor Planet Center on 23 May 2005 .

Notes

References

External links 
 Apostolos Christou, at Armagh Observatory, 7 Nov 2013
 Asteroid Lightcurve Database (LCDB), query form (info )
 Dictionary of Minor Planet Names, Google books
 Asteroids and comets rotation curves, CdR – Observatoire de Genève, Raoul Behrend
 Discovery Circumstances: Numbered Minor Planets (5001)-(10000) – Minor Planet Center
 
 

009084
Discoveries by David J. Asher
Named minor planets
19950203